Switzerland competed at the 2000 Summer Paralympics in Sydney, Australia. 54 competitors from Switzerland won 20 medals including 8 gold, 4 silver and 8 bronze to finish 20th in the medal table.

Medal table

See also 
 Switzerland at the Paralympics
 Switzerland at the 2000 Summer Olympics

References 

2000
2000 in Swiss sport
Nations at the 2000 Summer Paralympics